The Exact Cross is a season-long cyclo-cross competition, formerly known as the Ethias Cross and the Brico Cross, consisting of 8 rounds throughout the season in Belgium and the Netherlands. It is one of six season-long competitions, alongside the UCI Cyclo-cross World Cup, Cyclo-cross Superprestige, the X²O Badkamers Trophy (formerly known as the DVV Trophy, before that the BPost Bank Trophy and before that as the Gazet van Antwerpen trophy), the EKZ CrossTour and the Toi Toi Cup. In contrary to the other competitions, the Ethias Cross does not award points or compose an overall ranking, but rather consists of separate races. Sponsored by the Belgian hardware chain Brico for the first three seasons and then by the Belgian insurance company Ethias from 2019 to 2022, its main sponsor is the enterprise software provider Exact.

Individual race winners

Men

Women

External links

References

Cyclo-cross races
Cycle races in Belgium
Recurring sporting events established in 2016
2016 establishments in Belgium